Bohdan Andrew Futey (born June 28, 1939) is a senior judge of the United States Court of Federal Claims.

Early life, education, and career
Futey was born to parents Petro and Maria Futey in 1939 in Buczacz, Poland (now Buchach, Ukraine).  In 1943, his family moved to refugee camps in Germany and later immigrated to Argentina, where Futey graduated from high school. In 1957, his family moved to the United States. He became a naturalized U.S. citizen in 1962.

He received a Bachelor of Arts from Western Reserve University (now Case Western Reserve University in 1962. He was a teacher at Glenville High School in Cleveland, Ohio from 1962 to 1966, receiving a Master of Arts from Western Reserve University in 1964. He received his Juris Doctor at Cleveland–Marshall College of Law in 1968, and thereafter entered private practice in Parma, Ohio until 1972, as a founding partner in the law firm of Futey & Rakowsky.

He was then the chief assistant police prosecutor of Cleveland from 1972 to 1974. In 1974, Futey also unsuccessfully ran for Congress as an independent, garnering 1.7% of the vote. He was executive assistant to Cleveland Mayor Ralph J. Perk from 1974 to 1975, when he returned to private practice until 1984, as a partner in the law firm of Bazarko, Futey and Oryshkewych. He was Chairman of the Foreign Claims Settlement Commission of the United States from May 1984 until his appointment to the federal bench in 1987.

Futey has lectured on Constitutional Law at the Ukrainian Free University in Munich, at the University of Passau in Germany, and at National University of Kyiv-Mohyla Academy and Lviv University in Ukraine. He is a member of the District of Columbia Bar Association and the Ukrainian American Bar Association. He is admitted to practice in the State of Ohio, the U.S. District Court of Northern Ohio, and the District of Columbia.

Federal judicial service
On either January 30, 1987, or February 2, 1987, Futey was nominated by President Ronald Reagan to a seat on the United States Claims Court vacated by Philip R. Miller. Futey was confirmed by the United States Senate on May 7, 1987, and received his commission on May 7, 1987. He assumed senior status on May 6, 2002.

Personal life and other activities
Futey married Ukrainian American Myroslava "Myra" Fur, with whom he has three children.

Futey is actively involved with Democratization and Rule of Law programs organized by the Judicial Conference of the United States, the United States Department of State, and the American Bar Association in Ukraine and Russia. He has participated in judicial exchange programs, seminars, and workshops and has been a consultant to the working group on Ukraine's Constitution and Ukrainian Parliament. Futey is an advisor to the International Foundation for Electoral Systems (IFES).

Futey is fluent in Ukrainian and has visited regularly. He was in Ukraine when the pro-European Union protests began in November 2013.

References

External links 

1939 births
Living people
Case Western Reserve University alumni
Judges of the United States Court of Federal Claims
United States Article I federal judges appointed by Ronald Reagan
20th-century American judges
Cleveland–Marshall College of Law alumni
Polish emigrants to the United States
Ohio lawyers
People from Ternopil Oblast
Lawyers from Cleveland
Recipients of the Order of Prince Yaroslav the Wise